Kanakysaurus zebratus is a species of lizard in the family Scincidae. It is found in New Caledonia.

References

Kanakysaurus
Reptiles described in 2008
Taxa named by Ross Allen Sadlier
Taxa named by Aaron M. Bauer
Taxa named by Sarah A. Smith
Taxa named by Anthony Whitaker